Manchi Manasuku Manchi Rojulu is 1958 Indian Telugu-language drama film, produced by Sundarlal Nahatha, T. Ashwadanarayana under the Sri Productions banner and directed by C. S. Rao. The film stars N. T. Rama Rao, Rajasulochana  with music composed by Ghantasala. It is a remake of the Tamil film Thai Pirandhal Vazhi Pirakkum (1958).

Cast 
 N. T. Rama Rao as Raju
 Rajasulochana as Janaki
 Rajanala as Chinna Puli
 Relangi as Venkatappaiah
 Allu Ramalingaiah as Kethana
 Ramana Murthy as Dr. Raghu
 Peketi Sivaram as Compounder
 K.V.S.Sarma as Goppala Ganapathi
 Suryakantham as Kantham
 Girija as Lawyer Rani
 Jayasri
 Vasundara Devi

Soundtrack 
Music composed by Ghantasala.

Reception 
The film has celebrated Silver Jubilee and ran for 152 days in Vijayawada.

References

External links 
 

1958 films
1950s Telugu-language films
Films scored by Ghantasala (musician)
Telugu remakes of Tamil films
Films directed by C. S. Rao